María Victoria Chivite Navascués (born 5 June 1978) is a Spanish politician who serves as the President of the Government of Navarre. She has been the Secretary-General of the Socialist Party of Navarre (PSN–PSOE) since December 2014. A member of the 7th, 8th and 9th terms of the Parliament of Navarre, she also served as Senator between 2011 and 2015.

Early life and education 
Chivite was born on 5 June 1978 in Cintruénigo. A member of the Socialist Youth of Spain, she graduated from the Public University of Navarre with a degree in Sociology.

Career 
She was municipal councillor in Cintruénigo between 2003 and 2007, and in Valle de Egüés between 2011 and 2013. She was also a member of the 7th and 8th terms of the Parliament of Navarre. Chivite, who became a member of the Senate in 2011, was appointed as Spokesperson of the Socialist Parliamentary Group in the Upper House in 2014. Proclaimed as Secretary-General of the PSN-PSOE on 13 December 2014, Chivite ran first in the PSN-PSOE list vis-à-vis the 2015 Navarrese regional election. She repeated her bid in the 2019 regional election, with the Socialist list coming up second in seats after Navarra Suma.

Chivite was invested President of Navarre on 2 August 2019 Chivite government, commanding the yes votes of PSN-PSOE (11), Geroa Bai (9), Podemos (2), Izquierda-Ezkerra (1) groups in the regional legislature. The 20 MPs of the Navarra Suma parliamentary group voted against as well as 2 MPs of EH Bildu. The other 5 MPs of EH Bildu abstained. She assumed office on 6 August in a ceremony celebrated at the seat of the regional parliament.

Notes

References 

1978 births
Living people
Members of the 7th Parliament of Navarre
Members of the 9th Parliament of Navarre
Members of the 10th Parliament of Navarre
Members of the 10th Senate of Spain
Municipal councillors in Navarre
Politicians from Navarre
Presidents of the Government of Navarre
Spanish Socialist Workers' Party politicians
Women presidents of the autonomous communities of Spain
Women members of the Parliament of Navarre
People from Tudela (comarca)
Public University of Navarre alumni